This is a list of films produced by the Bollywood film industry based in Mumbai in 2006.

Box office collection

Released films

References

External links

2006
Lists of 2006 films by country or language
2006 in Indian cinema